MT-03 may refer to:
AutoGyro MT-03, a German autogyro
RotorSport UK MT-03, a British autogyro
Yamaha MT-03, a Japanese motorcycle